Carlos Pedro Eugenio Ruiz Padilla Sr. (September 6, 1909 - March 8, 1964) was a Filipino Olympic boxer and actor. Padilla was also a film director, with his first film being Susi ng Kalangitan which was made in 1937.

Personal life 
From a famous family of actors and politicians, he is the brother of actor José Padilla Jr. and actor-director-politician Roy Padilla Sr., father to international boxing referee Carlos "Sonny" Dolorico Padilla Jr., grandfather to entertainment industry's Divine Diva Zsa Zsa Padilla, and great-grandfather to Philippine singer Karylle and Zia.

References

External links
 

Carlos Padilla Sr.'s profile at Sports Reference.com

1909 births
1962 deaths
People from Manila
Boxers at the 1932 Summer Olympics
Olympic boxers of the Philippines
Carlos
20th-century Filipino male actors
Filipino male boxers
Filipino male film actors
Welterweight boxers